Cammarano v. United States, 358 U.S. 498 (1959), was a United States Supreme Court case in which the Court ruled that business may not deduct expenses they incurred for the "promotion or defeat of legislation" as "ordinary and necessary" business expenses on their federal income tax filing.

Opinion of the Court
In a unanimous opinion written by Justice John Marshall Harlan II, the Court held that "purchased publicity can influence the fate of legislation which will affect, directly or indirectly, all in the community," and therefore "everyone in the community should stand on the same footing as regards its purchase". Justice William O. Douglas filed a concurring opinion; he criticized the argument that "First Amendment rights are somehow not fully realized unless they are subsidized by the State", noting that the argument "may indeed conflict with the underlying premise that a complete hands-off policy on the part of government is at times the only course consistent with First Amendment rights."

See also
 List of United States Supreme Court cases
 List of United States Supreme Court cases, volume 358

References

External links 

United States Supreme Court cases
United States taxation and revenue case law
1959 in United States case law
United States Supreme Court cases of the Warren Court